Réal Ménard (born May 13, 1962) is a Canadian politician, who was a Bloc Québécois member of the House of Commons of Canada from 1993 to 2009. He was the second Canadian member of Parliament to come out as gay.

Ménard is a political scientist with B.A. and M.A. degrees and also holds his law degree from the University of Ottawa.

Federal politics
He first stood for federal office in the 1984 federal election as candidate for the small Parti nationaliste du Québec in Hochelaga–Maisonneuve. Defeated in this first try, he contested the riding in the 1993 election for the new and larger Bloc Québécois. He was elected, and re-elected in the riding in the 1997 and 2000 elections. Following redistricting, he was re-elected in the new riding of Hochelaga in the 2004, 2006 and 2008 federal elections.

Early in his parliamentary career, he served variously as Bloc critic for Health, for science, research and development, for Labour, for National Defence, and for the Federal Office of Regional Development-Quebec. From 1998 to June 29, 1999, he was critic for Citizenship and Immigration and for public housing; he then returned as health critic and served as vice-chair of the Standing Committee for three sessions. On September 14, 2001, he took on additional critic responsibility for the Montreal region.

On February 15, 1994 Ménard was the first member in the house of commons to use the word 'internet' saying "in building the electronic highway, the government will respect areas of provincial jurisdiction and ensure that communications linking us to Internet are also in French" 

In March 2006 he was shuffled from the health critic position to become the Bloc Québécois justice critic.

Municipal politics

In June 2009, Ménard announced that he was resigning from the House of Commons, effective September 16, in order to run as a Vision Montreal candidate for borough mayor of Mercier–Hochelaga-Maisonneuve in Montreal's 2009 municipal election. Prior to his first election to the House of Commons, he was a political assistant to Louise Harel, Vision Montreal's 2009 candidate for Mayor of Montreal, when she was a provincial MNA.

He won election to the borough mayoralty on November 1, 2009.

Electoral record (incomplete)
Municipal

Federal

References

External links
 

1962 births
Living people
Bloc Québécois MPs
Canadian LGBT Members of Parliament
Canadian political scientists
French Quebecers
Gay politicians
LGBT mayors of places in Canada
Canadian LGBT rights activists
Members of the House of Commons of Canada from Quebec
Montreal city councillors
Parti nationaliste du Québec politicians
People from Mercier–Hochelaga-Maisonneuve
University of Ottawa Faculty of Law alumni
21st-century Canadian politicians
21st-century Canadian LGBT people
Canadian gay men
20th-century Canadian politicians
20th-century Canadian LGBT people